Spialia confusa, the confusing sandman, is a butterfly of the family Hesperiidae. It is found in south-eastern Africa, from Zululand, Zimbabwe and Mozambique to Kenya.

The wingspan is 19–25 mm. These skippers are dark brown with white spots and both sides of the wings. In S. confusa, there is median band of white on the underside of the hindwings. Adults are on wing year-round with peaks from October to March.

The larvae feed on Melhania and Triumfetta species.

Subspecies
Spialia confusa confusa (central Tanzania, Malawi, northern Zambia, Mozambique, Zimbabwe, Eswatini, South Africa: Limpopo Province, Mpumalanga, KwaZulu-Natal)
Spialia confusa obscura Evans, 1937 (eastern and central Kenya, north-eastern Tanzania)

References

Spialia
Butterflies described in 1925